Zoya Akhtar (born 14 October 1972) is an Indian film director and screenwriter who works in Hindi cinema. After completing a diploma in filmmaking from NYU, she assisted directors such as Mira Nair, Tony Gerber and Dev Benegal, before becoming a writer and director herself. Akhtar is the recipient of several accolades, including five Filmfare Awards. Zoya, along with Reema Kagti founded Tiger Baby Films, a film and web studio, in October 2015. 

She has directed movies such as Luck by Chance (2009), Zindagi Na Milegi Dobara (2011) and Sheila Ki Jawani, a segment of Bombay Talkies (2013). She has co-written Talaash (2012) alongside Reema Kagti. She then went on to direct Dil Dhadakne Do (2015) and Gully Boy (2019).

She is the board member of Mumbai Academy of the Moving Image.

Personal life
Zoya Akhtar was born to poet, lyricist and screenwriter Javed Akhtar and screenwriter Honey Irani. Akhtar's stepmother is actress Shabana Azmi. Her younger brother, Farhan Akhtar, is an actor and director. She attended Maneckji Cooper and earned her Bachelor of Arts degree from St. Xavier's College, both from Mumbai. Later, she joined the New York University Tisch School of the Arts to learn film production.

Her great-grandfather, Fazl-e-Haq Khairabadi, a scholar of Islamic studies and theology, edited the first diwan of Mirza Ghalib on his request and later became a figure during the Indian Rebellion of 1857 in his native Khairabad.

She is great-granddaughter of Urdu poet Muztar Khairabadi and granddaughter of poet Jan Nisar Akhtar.

Akhtar grew up in an agnostic environment and along with her brother Farhan and father Javed Akhtar, and does not believe in any religion.

Career
Akhtar started her career as the co-director of a music video called Price of Bullets for a rock band called Pentagram. She has worked as a casting director for films including Split Wide Open (1999) and Dil Chahta Hai (2001), and as an assistant director for her brother Farhan Akhtar's films Dil Chahta Hai and Lakshya (2004). She then worked as an executive producer for her longtime associate and friend Reema Kagti's Honeymoon Travels Pvt. Ltd. (2007), also produced by Excel Entertainment.

Akhtar made her directorial debut with Luck By Chance (2009), starring her brother Farhan Akhtar and Konkona Sen Sharma. It tells the story of a struggling actor who breaks into the industry. The film was well received by critics, despite underperforming at the box office.

In 2011, she directed Zindagi Na Milegi Dobara, which starred an ensemble cast of Hrithik Roshan, Farhan Akhtar, Abhay Deol, Katrina Kaif and Kalki Koechlin. It turned out to be a huge commercial success at the box-office and won her the Filmfare Award for Best Director.

In 2013, Akhtar teamed up with Anurag Kashyap, Dibakar Banerjee and Karan Johar for Bombay Talkies. It was made as a celebration of 100 years of Indian cinema. She then went on to direct Dil Dhadakne Do (2015), a film based on a dysfunctional Punjabi family starring Anil Kapoor as an egotistical industrialist, Shefali Shah as his bitter socialite-wife, and Priyanka Chopra and Ranveer Singh as their children. The film also featured Anushka Sharma and Farhan Akhtar as love interests for Ranveer Singh and Priyanka Chopra respectively.

In 2015, Akhtar along with Reema Kagti founded Tiger Baby Films, an Indian film production company. 

In 2018, she then again teamed up with Anurag Kashyap, Dibakar Banerjee and Karan Johar for Lust Stories, which premiered on Netflix in June 2018.

After Dil Dhadakne Do, Akhtar directed Gully Boy starring Ranveer Singh and Alia Bhatt, loosely based on the lives of Mumbai rapper Naezy. Gully Boy won a second Best Director award at Filmfare. She thus became the only female director to win the award twice.

Zoya and Kagti also worked on a story for a web series produced by Tiger Baby Films and Excel Entertainment for Amazon Prime called Made in Heaven, a story about two wedding planners in New Delhi.

She has also been invited to be a member of the Academy of Motion Picture Arts and Sciences.

In October 2019, she began directing a segment of Ghost Stories (2020), a horror anthology film, consisting of 4 short film segments. Other segments are directed by Anurag Kashyap, Dibakar Banerjee, and Karan Johar. Ghost Stories premiered on Netflix on 1 January 2020.

In November 2021, Netflix announced that Akhtar would direct a live-action feature film adaptation of The Archies.

Filmography

Director

Executive producer

Lyricist

Other appearances
She appeared on the Valentine's Day charity show of Kaun Banega Crorepati along with her brother Farhan Akhtar. She also appeared in a very brief role as Rasa Devi's (Rekha's) courtesan in Kama Sutra: A Tale of Love in September 1996. She and Shah Rukh Khan had a 'fireside chat' with Jeff Bezos of Amazon in January 2020.

Awards and nominations

References

External links

 

Living people
Indian women film directors
Film directors from Mumbai
1972 births
Hindi-language film directors
21st-century Indian women writers
21st-century Indian writers
21st-century Indian dramatists and playwrights
Indian women screenwriters
21st-century Indian film directors
Women writers from Maharashtra
Hindi screenwriters
Women artists from Maharashtra
Screenwriters from Mumbai
Indian atheists
Indian agnostics
21st-century Indian screenwriters
Filmfare Awards winners
Screen Awards winners
Zee Cine Awards winners
International Indian Film Academy Awards winners